The group stage of the 2012 CECAFA Cup began on 24 November 2012 and ended on 1 December 2012. The matchdays were 24, 25, 26, 27, 28, 29, 30 November and 1 December.

The group stage featured 11 CECAFA associations and COSAFA member Malawi as the invited association. Teams were drawn into groups of four, where the top two teams from each group and the two best third-placed teams would advance to the knockout stage.

Tournament organizers moved the remaining group games from the Namboole Stadium as it had been in bad shape due to heavy rains. It was confirmed that on Saturday, 1 December, the Somalia–Tanzania and  Eritrea–Rwanda fixtures were moved to the Lugogo Stadium.  On the same day, the Sudan–Burundi and Malawi–Zanzibar fixtures were also moved to the Wankulukulu Stadium.

Tiebreakers
The order of tie-breakers used when two or more teams have equal number of points is:

 Number of points obtained in games between the teams involved;
 Goal difference in games between the teams involved;
 Goals scored in games between the teams involved;
 Away goals scored in games between the teams involved;
 Goal difference in all games;
 Goals scored in all games;
 Drawing of lots.

Group A

Group B

Group C

Third place qualification

Top scorers (at the group stage)

5 goals
  Mrisho Ngassa

4 goals
  John Bocco

3 goals

  Selemani Ndikumana
  Christophe Nduwarugira
  Chiukepo Msowoya
  Brian Umony

2 goals

  Clifton Miheso
  David Ochieng
  Dady Birori
  Khamis Mcha Khamis

1 goal

  Yusuf Ndikumana
  Yosief Ghide
  Hermon Tecleab
  Yonathan Kebede
  Elias Mamo
  Rama Salim
  Ndaziona Chatsalira
  Miciam Mhone
  Jean-Baptiste Mugiraneza
  Haruna Niyonzima
  Tumaine Ntamuhanga
  Jabril Hassan Mohammed
  Farid Mohammed
  Geoffrey Kizito
  Hamis Kiiza
  Robert Ssentongo

References

group